Portrait of Bianca Ponzoni Anguissola or Lady in White is an oil on canvas painting. It was painted in 1557 by Sofonisba Anguissola. The painting shows the artist's mother. It is now in the Gemäldegalerie, Berlin. It is securely identified as the artist's mother, since it reuses two elements from The Game of Chess, Lucia's pearl headdress and Minerva/Elena's necklace Under the arm of the chair are the signature and date "Sophonisba Angussola Virgo F. 15.5.7".

References

1557 paintings
Anguissola, Bianca
Anguissola, Bianca
Paintings in the Gemäldegalerie, Berlin